Edward Augustine "Big Ed" Walsh (May 14, 1881 – May 26, 1959) was an American pitcher and manager in Major League Baseball. From 1906 to 1912, he had several seasons where he was one of the best pitchers in baseball. Injuries shortened his career. Walsh holds the record for lowest career earned run average, 1.82. He is one of two modern (post-1901) pitchers to win 40 or more games in a single season, and the last pitcher to do so. He is the last pitcher from any team to throw more than 400 innings in a single season, a feat that he most recently accomplished in 1908. He was inducted into the Baseball Hall of Fame in 1946.

Early life
Walsh was born in Plains Township, Pennsylvania, to Michael and Jane Walsh. He worked in the Luzerne County coal mines when he was young. Walsh started his professional baseball career with the 1902 Meriden Silverites of the Connecticut State League. After playing the 1903 season with the Meriden Silverites and Newark Sailors of the Eastern League, the Chicago White Sox purchased Walsh's contract for $750 ($ in today's dollars).

MLB career

Peak years
Walsh made his major league debut in 1904 with the Chicago White Sox and pitched his first full season in 1906, going 17–13 with a 1.88 ERA and 171 strikeouts. In Game Three of that year's World Series, which the White Sox won over the Chicago Cubs in six games, Walsh struck out a then-World Series record 12 batters. He also struck out at least one batter each inning of that game; this feat has since been duplicated only once, by Bob Gibson in the 1968 World Series opener. From this season through 1912, Walsh averaged 24 victories and 220 strikeouts and posted an ERA below 2.00 five times. He also led the league in saves five times in this span. His finest individual season came in 1908 when he went 40–15 with 269 strikeouts, 6 saves and a 1.42 ERA, leading the American League in wins and strikeouts. In 1910, he posted the lowest ERA (1.27) for a pitcher with at least 20 starts and a losing record. Walsh also set an American League record by pitching 464 innings in a season. On August 27, 1911, Walsh no-hit the Boston Red Sox 5–0.

Interviewed for the 1966 book The Glory of Their Times, Hall of Famer Sam Crawford referred to Walsh's use of a pitch that was later outlawed: "Big Ed Walsh. Great big, strong, good-looking fellow. He threw a spitball. I think that ball disintegrated on the way to the plate, and the catcher put it back together again. I swear, when it went past the plate, it was just the spit went by".

In 1910, the White Sox opened White Sox Park, which was soon nicknamed Comiskey Park by the press in honor of team owner Charles Comiskey. The name was officially changed to Comiskey Park in 1913. An apocryphal story goes that architect Zachary Taylor Davis consulted Walsh in setting the park's field dimensions. Choosing a design that favored himself and other White Sox pitchers, rather than hitters, Walsh made Comiskey Park a "pitcher's park" for its entire 80-year history.

Later career

Walsh was a workhorse who pitched an average of 375 innings annually during the six seasons of 1907 through 1912. After the 1912 season, Walsh reportedly requested a full year off to rest his arm. Nevertheless, he showed up for spring training the following season, contending, "The White Sox needed me—implored me to return—so I did".

Walsh's playing time began dwindling in 1913. It has been claimed that he came into spring training in poorer physical shape than other members of the White Sox pitching staff, and his pride led him to try to keep up with the other pitchers in terms of pitch speed before getting into adequate shape, thereby causing damage to his pitching arm. "I could feel the muscles grind and wrench during the game, and it seemed to me my arm would leap out of my socket when I shot the ball across the plate", Walsh later recalled. "My arm would keep me awake till morning with a pain I had never known before". He pitched only 16 games during the 1913 season, and a meager 13 games over the next three years.

By 1916, Walsh's arm was dead. He wanted a year off, but Charles Comiskey released him instead. He attempted a comeback with the Boston Braves in 1917, but was let go, ending his major league career. He later did some pitching in the Eastern League, and gave umpiring a try (he umpired 87 American League games during the 1922 season), after which he was a coach for the White Sox for several seasons (1923–1924, 1928–1929).

Walsh retired with 195 wins, 126 losses, and 1736 strikeouts. His career ERA of 1.82 is the lowest major league ERA ever posted. He has the third-lowest career WHIP in MLB history (1.00) and the lowest ever for someone with 10 or more seasons pitched.

As a hitter, Walsh posted a .194 batting average (210-for-1,085) with 92 runs, 3 home runs, 68 RBI, 14 stolen bases and 46 bases on balls.

Managerial record

Later life and legacy
Walsh was inducted into the Baseball Hall of Fame in 1946. He died on May 26, 1959, 12 days after his 78th birthday.

In 1999, Walsh was ranked number 82 on The Sporting News''' list of the 100 Greatest Baseball Players, and was nominated as a finalist for the Major League Baseball All-Century Team. In 2011, he was inducted into the Irish American Baseball Hall of Fame.

Walsh's son Ed Walsh Jr. played for the White Sox from 1928 to 1932.

See also

 List of Major League Baseball no-hitters
 List of Major League Baseball annual ERA leaders
 List of Major League Baseball annual saves leaders
 List of Major League Baseball annual strikeout leaders
 List of Major League Baseball annual wins leaders
 Major League Baseball titles leaders

References

Further reading
 Coffey, Michael (2004). 27 Men Out: Baseball's Perfect Games. New York: Atria Books. .
 Kashatus, William C. (2002). Diamonds in the Coalfields: 21 Remarkable Baseball Players, Managers, and Umpires from Northeast Pennsylvania. Jefferson, North Carolina: McFarland & Company. .
Smiles, Jack. (2007) Big Ed Walsh: The Life of a Spitballing Hall of Famer'' Jefferson, NC: McFarland.

External links

SABR Biography Project

1881 births
1959 deaths
American League ERA champions
American League strikeout champions
American League wins champions
American people of Welsh descent
Baseball players from Pennsylvania
Bridgeport Americans players
Chicago White Sox coaches
Chicago White Sox managers
Chicago White Sox players
Major League Baseball pitchers
Meriden Silverites players
Milwaukee Brewers (minor league) players
Minor league baseball managers
National Baseball Hall of Fame inductees
Newark Sailors players
People from Luzerne County, Pennsylvania
People from Pompano Beach, Florida
Wilkes-Barre/Mount Carmel players